Marcia Tate (born 23 June 1961) is a Jamaican sprinter. She competed in the women's 4 × 400 metres relay at the 1988 Summer Olympics.

References

External links
 

1961 births
Living people
Athletes (track and field) at the 1988 Summer Olympics
Jamaican female sprinters
Olympic athletes of Jamaica
Athletes (track and field) at the 1990 Commonwealth Games
Commonwealth Games competitors for Jamaica
Place of birth missing (living people)
Olympic female sprinters
20th-century Jamaican women